Dennis Barden is a mathematician at the University of Cambridge working in the fields of geometry and topology. He is known for his classification of the simply connected compact 5-manifolds and, together with Barry Mazur and John R. Stallings, for having proved the s-cobordism theorem. Barden received his Ph.D. from Cambridge in 1964 under the supervision of C. T. C. Wall.

Academic Positions 
Barden is a Life Fellow of Girton College, Cambridge and emeritus fellow of Pembroke College. In 1991, he became Director of Studies for mathematics at Pembroke College, succeeding Raymond Lickorish. He held the position until Michaelmas 2003, and in his time saw a great increase in the number of applicants for mathematics, with consistently high performances in Tripos exams. He remains an active supervisor at Pembroke and Girton College.

Selected publications

References

1936 births
Living people
21st-century British mathematicians
20th-century British mathematicians
Topologists
Academics of the University of Cambridge
Alumni of the University of Cambridge